Saumya Liyanage is an actor in Sri Lankan cinema, stage drama and television. He is a senior lecturer and currently the Dean, Faculty of Graduate Studies in University of the Visual and Performing Arts by profession. Highly versatile actor mainly involved in dramatic roles, Saumya is the son of veteran dramatist Hemasiri Liyanage and brother of musician Indrachapa Liyanage.

Personal life
Liyanage completed his bachelor's degree of arts (BA) from University of Kelaniya and then master's degree in Creative Arts from Flinders University, South Australia. He completed Phd. from La Trobe University, Melbourne in Drama Program under the guidance of Dr. Rob Conkie.

Career
He started stage work early 1990s when he is an undergraduate at the Kelaniya University. After that, he became a continues leading actor in stage drama. His maiden television acting came through the drama Sittara Gurunnanse in 1992. He acted handful of television dramas and particularly rejecting soap operas and mega teledramas. He went Australia in 2010 for academic activities and returned in 2014. By 2010, he performed in Rajitha Dissanayake's stage play Apahu Harenna Ba, where he won the Best Actor Award at the State Drama Festival that year. Then he acted in Indika Ferdinando's stage play Colombo Colombo. The play was selected for the International Women's Drama Festival in India and held two seasons for Indian audiences in New Delhi and Mumbai.

Liyanage started his film career with Padadaya back in 1999, directed by Linton Semage. His most popular cinema acting came through films Aba, Walapatala and Nimnayaka Hudekalawa. The role in Aba as Habaraa was highly praised by the critics. In 2014, he appeared in the Asoka Handagama's play Antique Kadayaka Maranayak.

Selected theater works
 Clouds Nine (1994) Produced by the Department of English, University of Kelaniya
 N’Kruma Ni Africa Ni (1995)
 Kontharaththuwa (2005)
 Hansaintath Man Asai (1996)
 Daru Prashne Puthra Prashne (1997)
 Gabsawa (1998)
 Last Bus Eke Kathawa (1999)
 Mata Wedi Thiyan Nedda? (1999)
 Dawasa Thama Gewne Ne (1999)
 Mata Erehiwa Mama (2001)
 Closer (2001) (An Original Play by Patrick Maber) - Performed at the Flinders University, South Australia
 Horu Samaga Heluwen (2005)
 Weeraya Merila (2006)
 Apasu Herenna Be (2008)
 Colombo Colombo (2008)
 The Irresistible Rise of Mr. Signno (2016)

Selected television serials
 Sittara Gurunnanse (1992)
 Kalpanthayak (1993)
 Ramya Nagaraya (1995)
 Bambara Sakmana (1995)
 Manasthapaya (1996)
 Itipahan (1996)
 Imadiya Mankada (1997)
 Nikini Paluwa (1999)
 Mangalam (2001)
 Apparitions (2006)
 Diul Gase Kola Sulange Wisira Yathi (2007)

Author work
 Meditations On Acting.

Filmography

Awards and accolades
He has won several awards at the state theater festivals and local film festivals.

Sarasaviya Awards

|-
|| 2007 ||| Aganthukaya || Best Actor || 
|-
|| 2008 ||| Walapatala || Best Supporting Actor || 
|-
|| 2017 ||| Nimnayaka Hudekalawa || Best Actor ||

ADSA Awards

|-
|| 2011 ||| ‘My body taught me how to act – towards an epistemology of actor learning and apprenticeship || Best Paper ||

22nd Bunka Awards

|-
|| 2015 ||| Drama/Acting || Creative activities in culture and arts ||

References

External links
My Body Taught Me How to Act: Towards an Epistemology of Actor Learning and Apprenticeship
Annual Int’l Research Symposium - 2018 “Changing World, Challenging Boundaries”
A research network for the field of Performance Philosophy
Critique on critiques
Critique theatre at its compelling best
He remains pseudo-puritans change

Sri Lankan male film actors
Sinhalese male actors
Living people
Year of birth missing (living people)